Barry Glassman (born March 24, 1962) is an American politician who served as the 7th county executive of Harford County, Maryland, from 2014 to 2022. He was previously a member of the Maryland State Senate, representing District 35 in Harford County, Maryland; he was appointed in 2008 to fill a vacancy, and subsequently was re-elected to the position in 2010. Glassman was originally elected to the Maryland House of Delegates, District 35A in 1998, along with Joanne S. Parrott, defeating incumbent Michael G. Comeau and winning the seat left vacant by James M. Harkins, who was elected as Harford County Executive. He was the Republican nominee for Comptroller of Maryland in the 2022 election, which he lost to state delegate Brooke Lierman.

Early life and education
Glassman was born on March 24, 1962, in Havre de Grace, Maryland, and grew up on a sheep farm in Level. He graduated from Havre de Grace High School in 1980. He also attended Meadowvale Elementary and Havre de Grace Middle School. After high school, he attended Washington College, where he graduated in 1984 with a B.A. in political science.

Career
After college, Glassman was a claims investigative specialist with Travelers Insurance Company. He worked there until 1990 when he took a position with Baltimore Gas and Electric Company.

Glassman became active in politics soon after college. He became a member of the Maryland Association of Counties in 1990 and was active until 1998. He was also a member of the National Association of Counties during the same time, serving on the rural affairs committee. He has been a member of the Maryland Claims Adjusters since 1990.

Harford County Council
In 1990, he also became a member of the Harford County Council, serving until 1998. He was the vice-president in 1995. He has served on several task forces, including the Task Force on Resource-Based Industry in Maryland, the Task Force to Study Motor Vehicle Salvage Inspection and Titling Practices, the Study Commission on Public Funding of Campaigns in Maryland, and the Task Force on the Future for Growth and Development in Maryland.

At a local level, Glassman is a member of the American Sheep Council, Harford County 4-H Club, the Harford County Farm Bureau, the Level Volunteer Fire Company, and Omicron Delta Kappa National Leadership Society.

In the legislature
Glassman was sworn into the Maryland House of Delegates on January 13, 1999. He was a member of the Environmental Matters Committee, the Economic Matters Committee, and the Commerce and Government Matters Committee. He was also the chair of the Harford County Delegation and the Republican Policy Committee, and a member of the Maryland Legislative Sportmen's Caucus, the Maryland Rural Caucus, the Maryland Bicycle and Pedestrian Caucus, the Maryland Veterans Caucus, and the Taxpayers Protection Caucus.

In January 2008, Glassman was appointed to the Maryland Senate, succeeding state Senator J. Robert Hooper, who had resigned for medical reasons. He was a member of the Finance Committee and the Protocol Committee, was the Senate Chair of the Harford County Delegation, and a member of the Maryland Veterans Caucus.

Harford County Executive
On June 7, 2013, Glassman said he would not seek re-election to the Maryland Senate in 2014, instead announcing a run for Harford County executive. He was unopposed in the Republican primary, and defeated Joe Werner in the general election with 74.8 percent of the vote. He was sworn in on December 1, 2014. Glassman ran for re-election in 2018, winning a second term with 67.4 percent of the vote.

In November 2015, Glassman said he was considering a run for the Republican nomination in the 2016 United States Senate election in Maryland. In January 2016, he said he would not run for Senate, instead continuing to serve as county executive.

2022 Maryland Comptroller candidacy

In December 2020, Glassman, who is term-limited from running for a third-term as Harford County executive, said he was "weighing his options" on a possible run for governor, comptroller, or a congressional seat. On April 15, 2021, Glassman announced that he would run for Comptroller of Maryland in the 2022 election. In announcing his run, Glassman said he would have ran for Maryland's 1st congressional district in 2022 had incumbent U.S. Representative Andy Harris "kept his promise on term limits".

He was unopposed in the Republican primary but lost to state Delegate Brooke Lierman in the general election.

Following the Republican primaries, Glassman refused to endorse either of the other two statewide Republican nominees — Dan Cox and Michael Peroutka.

Political positions
Glassman has been described as a moderate Republican.

Development initiatives
During his first year as county executive, Glassman unveiled a plan to revive development initiatives at the James Run corporate site near I-95, and with establishing an agricultural research and exposition center near Dublin.

In May 2022, Glassman vetoed a bill that would place a building development moratorium on the Perryman Peninsula, saying that the bill was "illegal" and violated the Harford County Code and the County Charter. The Harford County Council did not override Glassman's veto on the bill, despite previously voting unanimously to pass the bill.

Education
In February 2021, Glassman said he supported a bill introduced in the Maryland Senate to create an all-elected school board in Harford County.

Gun control
In March 2013, Glassman said that he opposed the Firearm Safety Act of 2013, calling the bill "an infringement on the law-abiding folks" and not a deterrent to criminals who use guns. Glassman voted against the bill in April 2013.

Healthcare
Glassman supported the creation of Maryland's Prescription Drug Affordability Board, a body tasked with making recommendations to the Maryland General Assembly on how to make prescription drugs more affordable. In May 2019, Glassman wrote an op-ed to Maryland Matters calling on Maryland governor Larry Hogan to sign the bill creating the agency into law.

Marijuana
In 2003, Glassman voted against a bill to legalize medical marijuana in Maryland, calling the bill a "revenue enhancement act for the drug dealers". Glassman later reversed his position on marijuana, supporting and voting for legislation to legalize medical marijuana and decriminalize small amounts of the drug in 2014, but said he did not support the full legalization of marijuana. In August 2021, Glassman said that he had "no objection" to putting the question of legalizing cannabis before voters, but said he'd "wait for pass judgement on the implementation legislation".

Social issues
Glassman opposed the Civil Marriage Protection Act, voting against it in both 2011 and 2012 and telling The Baltimore Sun, "I don't have a problem providing some right and privileges within a civil union, but I don't want to redefine what a traditional marriage is."

In March 2013, Glassman voted against legislation that would repeal the death penalty in Maryland.

In February 2019, Glassman called on state Delegate Mary Ann Lisanti, who represents part of Harford County in District 34A, to resign after she used the n-word to describe a Prince George's County legislative district.

Glassman condemned the 2021 United States Capitol attack, sending a tweet during the attack that read "Put this rebellion down!" and later sending an email condemning U.S. Representative Andy Harris's role in the incident. Shortly after the events, Glassman announced he would consider a run against Harris in 2022, but he ultimately ran for Comptroller of Maryland in 2022 instead.

Taxes
In May 2012, Glassman voted against Senate Bill 1302. In March 2013, he voted against a bill to raise the gas tax to replenish the state's transportation fund.

Personal life
Aside from politics, Glassman is a sheep farmer who lives in Darlington, Maryland, and is married to his wife, Dari. Together, they have one child and one grandchild.

Election results

References

External links
Campaign Website
Official Biography from Maryland Manual On-Line

1962 births
20th-century American politicians
21st-century American politicians
Harford County Executives
Living people
Republican Party Maryland state senators
Republican Party members of the Maryland House of Delegates
People from Havre de Grace, Maryland
Washington College alumni
Candidates in the 2022 United States elections